is a Japanese football player. He plays for Gamba Osaka.

Career
Kanta Usui joined J1 League club Gamba Osaka in 2017.

References

External links

1999 births
Living people
Association football people from Hyōgo Prefecture
Japanese footballers
J1 League players
Gamba Osaka players
Association football defenders